Osco is an unincorporated community in Osco Township, Henry County, Illinois, United States.

Geography

Demographics

References

 

Unincorporated communities in Illinois
Unincorporated communities in Henry County, Illinois